Steve Seventy (June 12, 1927 – July 6, 1988) was a Democratic member of the Pennsylvania House of Representatives.

He died in office of pancreatic cancer in 1988.

References

Democratic Party members of the Pennsylvania House of Representatives
1988 deaths
1927 births
20th-century American politicians